The Stampen Group is a Swedish media group and one of Sweden's biggest newspaper owners. The main businesses are local newspapers, of which the largest is Göteborgs-Posten. It was founded in 2005. The Stampen Group owns a total of 23 Swedish newspapers, 35 free local weeklies, the printing group V-TAB and distribution companies. The Stampen Media Partner is a business area in the Stampen Group with several large Swedish online communities and mobile marketing agency Mobiento. mktmedia is a development company within the group, developing common platforms for web publishing and mobile marketing for 47 Swedish newspaper titles.

Owners 

Peter Hjörne and family: (65% stake, 74% voting rights)
Marika Cobbold and family: (14% stake, 13% voting rights)
Sven Nordgren and family: (14% stake, 11% voting rights)
Other: (7% stake, 2% voting rights)

Business areas 
Göteborgs-Posten
Promedia
Mediabolaget Västkusten
GISAB
V-TAB
Stampen Media Partner

References

External links 
 stampen.com

Mass media companies established in 2005
Mass media companies of Sweden
Mass media in Gothenburg
Newspaper companies of Sweden
Swedish companies established in 2005